The 2022–23 season is the 102nd season in the existence of Deportivo Alavés.  Alavés plays in the Segunda División, the second division of men's professional football in Spain after being relegated from the Spanish first division La Liga last season, finishing in last place.

Players

Transfers

Summer window 
Deals officialized beforehand were effective starting 1 July 2022.

In

Loan in

Loan returns

Out

Loans out

Loans ended

Winter window 
Deals officialized beforehand will be effective starting 1 January 2023.

Pre-season and friendlies

Competitions

Overall record

Segunda División

League table

Results summary

Results by round

Matches

Copa del Rey

References

Deportivo Alavés seasons
Deportivo Alavés